Pianos in the Parks is a public-private partnership led by Onereel, Seattle Parks and Recreation, King County Parks and local arts and business organizations.

The program places artistically decorated pianos in parks and open spaces in Seattle, Bellevue and King County during the Summer.

These pianos have been well loved and heavily played for many years. Unfortunately, pianos don't get better with age and they are usually destined to end up in landfills and recycling centers. According to KEXP, these pianos are getting a new life thanks to "Classic Pianos, who have generously [donated them and] offered to tune and transport them, and students and instructors from Gage Academy of Art, who will give each instrument a makeover...[and] anyone is invited to 'tickle the ivories' of any piano they come across."

Locations
According to the map on the Pianos in the Park website, pianos were placed at the following locations, with appearance years listed:
 Alki Beach Park: 2014
 Ashworth Plaza: 2015
 Ballard Commons Park: 2014, 2015
 Bellevue Botanical Garden: 2015 
 Bellevue Downtown Park: 2015
 Bellevue SOMA Towers: 2019
 Burke-Gilman: 2014												
 Cal Anderson Park: 2014, 2015
 City Hall Plaza: 2014
 Denny Park: 2014, 2015
 Green Lake Park: 2014, 2015
 Hing Hay Park: 2014, 2019
 Jefferson Park: 2015
 Lake Union Park: 2015
 Luther Burbank Park: 2015
 Magnuson Park: 2015
 Maple Leaf Reservoir: 2014
 Marina Park: 2015
 Marymoor Park: 2014, 2015
 Mercerdale Park: 2015
 Occidental Square Park: 2015, 2019
 Othello Playground: 2014
 Pier 62/63: 2014 
 Rainier Beach Plaza: 2014, 2015
 Sam Smith Park: 2014
 Sammamish River Trail: 2014, 2015
 Sea-Tac Airport: 2015
 Seacrest Park: 2015
 Seattle Center: 2014, 2015, 2019
 Steve Cox Memorial Park: 2014, 2015
 Volunteer Park: 2014, 2015, 2019
 Westlake Park: 2014
 Wilmot Gateway Park: 2014

Website
Official Website: http://pianosintheparks.com/

External links 
 Laird Norton Wealth Management, http://lairdnortonwm.com/
 Gage Academy of Art, http://www.gageacademy.org/
 Classic Pianos, http://seattle.classicpianos.net/

Notes

Culture of Seattle